John Drewe (born 1948) is a British forger.

John Drewe may also refer to:
John Drewe (MP) (fl. 1393), English politician

See also
John Drew (disambiguation)